A strike suit is a lawsuit of questionable merit brought by a single person or group of people with the purpose of gaining a private settlement before going to court that would be less than the cost of the defendant's legal costs.  Such suits frequently appear where the defendant is a considerably larger entity than the plaintiff, such as a corporation or an estate.

Strike suits in securities law
Company shareholders sometimes use strike suits as a means of addressing perceived failures by or discontentment with the company while avoiding becoming embroiled in litigation themselves.

A minor shareholder sues a company for falling short on projected earnings.  The lawsuit makes multiple technical claims of incompetence by the company.
A minor shareholder sues a company for failure to follow bylaws set by the company.  The lawsuit makes multiple technical claims of bylaw infractions by the company.

See also
In terrorem
Patent trolls

References

Corporate law
United States securities law
Lawsuits